Honoré Louit (16 January 1900 – 29 April 1981) was a sailor from France, who represented his country at the 1924 Summer Olympics in Le Havre, France.

References

Sources
 
 

French male sailors (sport)
Sailors at the 1924 Summer Olympics – 6 Metre
Olympic sailors of France
1900 births
1981 deaths